Pro-Act by VTC (Pro-Act) is a post-secondary educational institution in Hong Kong that provides industry-specific training courses. The organisation was established in 1984 to provide practical training and professional development.

References

1984 establishments in Hong Kong
Educational institutions established in 1984
Universities and colleges in Hong Kong